The Concord Mountain Lions are the athletic teams that represent Concord University, located in Athens, West Virginia, in NCAA Division II intercollegiate sports. The Mountain Lions compete as members of the Mountain East Conference in all fifteen sports.

Varsity teams

List of teams

Men's sports
 Baseball
 Basketball
 Cross Country
 Football
 Golf
 Soccer
 Track and Field

Women's sports
 Basketball
 Cross Country
 Golf
 Soccer
 Softball
 Track and Field
 Volleyball
 Cheerleading

Individual programs

Football
On November 29, 2014, the football team won its first-ever playoff game by beating West Chester University 51–36. This was also its first 12–0 season. The following week they beat Bloomsburg University 32–26 to advance to the semifinals. On December 13, 2014, in the semifinals game in Mankato, Minnesota, Concord lost to Minnesota State University, Mankato 47–13, ending the season with a record of 13–1, their best ever.

References

External links